Raghuvir Mothibhai Patel (born 1944) is a former Kenyan cricketer who played internationally for East Africa, including at the 1982 ICC Trophy. He played as a wicket-keeper.

A regular player for Kenya in regional tournaments, Patel first played for East Africa in 1972, when he toured England with the team. He played his one and only first-class match in January 1974, against a Marylebone Cricket Club team that was returning the tour. In the match, Patel had little success with the bat, but did have future England captain Mike Brearley out caught behind from the bowling of Vasant Tapu. After that, he did not again play internationally until the 1982 ICC Trophy in England, where he shared the wicket-keeping duties with Narendra Thakker. He was one of the few East African players at the tournament with first-class experience.

See also
 List of Kenyan first-class cricketers

References

External links
 Player profile and statistics at CricketArchive
 Player profile and statistics at ESPNcricinfo

1944 births
Living people
East African cricketers
Kenyan cricketers
Kenyan people of Indian descent
Wicket-keepers